is a Japanese media personality, actress, voice actress, illustrator, and singer. Also known by her nickname , she is best known as the presenter of Pokémon Sunday, and as the performer of the opening theme from the anime Gurren Lagann.

Biography
Born to actor and musician Katsuhiko Nakagawa, a celebrity in Japan in the 1980s, she was raised in Nakano by her mother after her father's death from leukemia in 1994. Nakagawa found escape from bullies by connecting with Pokémon when she was in 5th grade. "When I was a kid, I didn't have friends, but I did have Pokémon."

At the time of her birth, she and her mother had to remain in the hospital, and her maternal aunt was left with registering her in the koseki.

She made her entertainment debut in 2001, winning the Grand Prix award at the Popolo Girl Audition and representing the Jackie Chan talent agency. Later, on the "Yume-Ga-Oka Residence" programme on SKY PerfecTV!, she was given a Jackie Chan photobook by Midorikawa Shobō, who were guests on the show. She commented "I thought he was an enemy of Bruce Lee's", apparently referring to Enter the Dragon.

In 2002, she was chosen as Miss Shōnen Magazine.

Her official blog, Shokotan * Blog, opened in 2004, and by April 2006 it had received a total of 100 million hits. On February 2, 2008, the daily Japanese newspaper Mainichi Shimbun reported that her blog had been accessed 1 billion times.

In 2004, she made a guest appearance in the 38th episode of Tokusou Sentai Dekaranger, after having previously appeared as a child in Chikyuu Sentai Fiveman. She later appeared with Katsumura on Men B.

She appeared in a brief section of "Kangaeru Hito" ("People who think") on the Fuji TV network in 2004 as an illustrator, after which she appeared regularly on the later version of the programme which started with minor changes in early 2005, "Kangaeru Hitokoma" ("Thinking about one frame [of a cartoon strip]"). On the Fuji TV show Kangaeru Hitokoma, on which she is an occasional guest, she drew in the style of Kazuo Umezu.

For one year starting in May 2005, she appeared as a regular on the TBS programme "Ōsama no Brunch". In July 2006, she released her debut single "Brilliant Dream". It entered the Oricon chart at number 29, with initial sales of 6313 copies. Nakagawa performed at Anime Expo 2008 at the Los Angeles Convention Center.

Some of her work was shown on the May 11, 2006, edition of Downtown Deluxe on the Nippon TV network, She was a member of the judging panel in the "Jump Damashii" section of the Shūeisha publication Weekly Shōnen Jump, starting from Jump number 13 of 2006.

On the May 30, 2006, airing of Kasupe!, in the section entitled , "Fuji Bank Celebrity Evaluator", it was discovered that she liked the manga Kachō Shima Kōsaku, eliciting a comment from the host, Sayaka Aoki, that she had pretty "grown-up tastes".

In 2009, she opened a store called "mmts" with the theme of her hobby in Nakano Broadway.

In 2009–2010, she appeared in a series of commercials for Norton AntiVirus.

In March 2014, Nakagawa's book of autobiographical essays, Neko no Ashiato ("Cats' Pawprints"), was published by Magazine House. In March 2015, the book was adapted as an anime series titled Omakase Mamitasu ("Leave It to Mamitasu") on NHK, which featured characters based on Nakagawa's cat and her late father and grandfather.

In 2018, Nakagawa returned to Anime Expo to perform as part of Anisong World Matsuri.

In 2019, Nakagawa performed the song  with Sachiko Kobayashi, which was used as the theme song to the theatrical film Mewtwo Strikes Back: Evolution; it is a cover of a song originally performed by Kobayashi, which was used as the theme song to the 1998 film Pokémon: The First Movie.

Filmography

TV
 AX MUSIC-TV 00 (2003–2004)
  (2006–2010)
  (2004) as Falupian Yaako (guest appearance) Episode 38
  (2006)
  (2007)
  (2007)
  (2007–2012)
  (2007–2010)
  (2008)
  (2009)
  (2010–2013)
  (2013–2015)
  (2014) as Okita
  (2015)
  (2015-present)
  (2016)
  (2017)
  (2017)

Films
 Kabuto-O Beetle (2005)
 Umezu Kazuo: Kyofu Gekijo – Zesshoku (2005)
 Koala Kacho / Executive Koala (2005)
 The Fast and the Furious: Tokyo Drift (2006)
 X-Cross (2007)
 Gothic Lolita Battle Bear (2013)

Stageplays
 Maybe Happy Ending (2020)

Anime

Pokémon films
Nakagawa also has voiced characters in every Pokémon movie since 2007 (except Pokémon the Movie: Genesect and the Legend Awakened and Pokémon: Mewtwo Strikes Back—Evolution):

Video games
 Dragon Quest Heroes (2015) – Alena
 Dragon Quest Heroes II (2016) – Alena
 Toukiden 2 (2016) – Gwen
 Itadaki Street: Dragon Quest and Final Fantasy 30th Anniversary (2017) – Alena
 Kingdom Hearts III (2019) – Rapunzel

Japanese dub

Live-action
Moon Geun-young
Innocent Steps – Jang Chae-min
My Little Bride – Bo-eun
 Silent Hill (2006) – Alessa Gillespie (voice-over for Jodelle Ferland)
 Transformers: Age of Extinction (2014) – Tessa Yeager (voice-over for Nicola Peltz)
 Ra.One (2015) – Desi/Dawsal (voice-over for Priyanka Chopra)
 Venom (2018) – Anne Weying (voice-over for Michelle Williams)
 Venom: Let There Be Carnage (2021) – Anne Weying (voice-over for Michelle Williams)

Animation
 Tangled The Series (2017–2020) – Rapunzel
 Tangled (2010) – Rapunzel
 Ralph Breaks the Internet (2018) – Rapunzel
Puss in Boots: The Last Wish (2023) – Goldilocks

Discography

Shoko Nakagawa is signed to Sony Japan.

Singles

Collaboration Singles

Cover albums

Mini albums

Best albums

Albums

Other songs
"Moeyo Giza Mimi Pichū!" (Ending for Pokémon the Series: Diamond and Pearl)
"Dori Dori" (Ending for Pokémon the Series: XY)
"Kaze to isshu ni" (Ending for Pokémon: Mewtwo Strikes Back—Evolution)
"Taipu: Wairudo" (Ending for Pokémon the Series: Sun & Moon)

Printed media

Photobooks

Blogs

References

External links

  
 Watanabe Entertainment profile 
 Official website of Shoko Nakagawa's label 
 Shoko Nakagawa's brand 
 Shoko Nakagawa's blog 
 Shoko Nakagawa's pet cat blog 

1985 births
Living people
Actresses from Tokyo
Japanese bloggers
Japanese television personalities
Japanese women pop singers
Japanese women rock singers
Japanese idols
Japanese gravure models
Japanese film actresses
Japanese lyricists
Japanese television actresses
Japanese video game actresses
Japanese voice actresses
Mandarin-language singers of Japan
Cosplayers
Sony Music Entertainment Japan artists
Singers from Tokyo
Anime singers
Pokémon
Japanese women bloggers
Watanabe Entertainment
20th-century Japanese actresses
21st-century Japanese actresses
21st-century Japanese singers
21st-century Japanese women singers